Little Pixie Geldof (born 17 September 1990) is an English model and singer. She is the third daughter of Bob Geldof and Paula Yates.

Early life
Geldof is the third daughter of Bob Geldof and Paula Yates. She is also the biological granddaughter of Hughie Green. Pixie had two sisters, Fifi Trixibelle Geldof (born 1983) and Peaches Geldof (1989–2014), and has a half-sister, Heavenly Hiraani Tiger Lily Hutchence Geldof (born 1996), from her mother's relationship with INXS frontman Michael Hutchence. Her great-grandmother was Jewish.

Career

Modelling
Her first magazine cover modelling appearance was for Tatler in 2008. She has also been the face of advertising campaigns for Levi's, Diesel, Henry Holland, Razzle, Agent Provocateur, Loewe and Pringle of Scotland, as well as modelling for Vivienne Westwood, Luella and Jeremy Scott. She modelled for Debenhams in 2010.

Music
Geldof is the lead singer of the band Violet, who released their first single in May 2012. She was scheduled to DJ at the 2014 Coachella in April but cancelled it due to the death of her sister.

She released her first album I'm Yours in November 2016. It was recorded in Los Angeles and produced by Tony Hoffer.

Activism 
Geldof has a passion for marine wildlife, especially sharks. She is an advocate for marine conservation and was one of the ambassadors for the #PassOnPlastic campaign against the pollution of water by single use plastic led by Project Zero and Sky Ocean Rescue.

She also advocates against animal testing in the cosmetic industry. In October 2018, she was part of a delegation that went to the United Nations in New York City to present a petition launched by The Body Shop to end cosmetic animal testing worldwide.

Personal life
As of February 2013, Geldof lived in Upper Clapton with George Barnett, drummer of These New Puritans. The couple married in June 2017 in Majorca. They have one child, a daughter, born in 2021. 

Geldof is a vegan and advocates against animal testing.

References

External links

1990 births
Living people
People educated at Alleyn's School
English female models
English socialites
English people of Irish descent
English people of Scottish descent
English people of Jewish descent
English people of Belgian descent
People from Upper Clapton
Models from London
Singers from London
21st-century English women singers
21st-century English singers